Rosanna Alish Waterland (born 30 May 1986) is an Australian comedian, author, screenwriter, and actress. Waterland first rose to popularity in 2013 with her satirical recaps of the first season of The Bachelor Australia. Fellow author and ABC presenter Richard Glover called what she did "the best television writing since Clive James". Waterland has also published two best-selling books: The Anti Cool Girl, Every Lie I've Ever Told.

Books 
Waterland's first book, The Anti Cool Girl, published by HarperCollins in 2015, was a critically acclaimed national bestseller. It was shortlisted for two Indie Book Awards, the Russell Prize for Humour Writing and two Australian Book Industry Awards, including best biography and best new writer of the year. It won the Australian Book Industry Awards People's Choice Award for Best New Writer of the Year. The Anti Cool Girl sold over 45,000 in its first few months in stores, making it one of the most popular young Australian memoirs in recent memory.

Waterland's second book, Every Lie I've Ever Told, was published in July 2017. It also went on to become a national bestseller, subsequently being named number 41 in the Dymocks Top 101 Books Of All Time list.

In April 2019, it was announced that Waterland had signed a significant two-book fiction deal with HarperCollins Australia. The first of these books will be published in 2024.

Along with her own books, Waterland has also been featured in several popular anthologies. These include Mothers and Others, Better Than Sex, Best Australian Comedy Writing and Choice Words - A collection of writing about abortion.

Waterland's written work has also been published by the Mamamia Women's Network (where she was a senior editor until 2015), Huffington Post US, UK and Germany, Role Reboot, Cleo magazine, Cosmopolitan magazine, Harper's Bazaar, Sunday Life and Spectrum.

Television 
Waterland has been a contributing writer and actress on multiple Australian TV shows, most notably ABC's Tonightly and Channel Ten's Sisters. She was also co-star and creator of ABC satirical political documentary series, What’s Going On: With Jamila Rizvi and Rosie Waterland, which first aired in 2016 and can now be seen on ABC iView.

Waterland is currently creator, writer and actress on a new drama series in pre-production due to be distributed by Stan Australia in 2023, in development with Closer and Highview Productions.

Stage tours 
Waterland debuted her first live one-woman show at the Melbourne International Comedy Festival in March 2016, called "My Life On The Couch (with vodka)". The show sold out every performance, and she took the show on a sold-out national tour in October of the same year. She toured Australia with her second one-woman show, "Crazy Lady", in September 2017.

Waterland's next one-woman show, Kid Chameleon, began touring nationally in February 2020, but was put on hiatus due to the pandemic. Kid Chameleon will resume touring in 2023, and is due to be filmed and distributed as a comedy special in 2024.

Podcasting 
In 2017, Waterland created and produced a podcast based on her first book, The Anti-Cool Girl, called Mum Says My Memoir Is A Lie. Mum Says was hugely popular and critically acclaimed, going on to win the 2018 Australian Commercial Radio Award (ACRA) for Best Original Podcast.

Mum Says My Memoir Is A Lie topped the iTunes Podcast chart in its first week of release and continued to appear on the Top Ten chart throughout its weekly episode drops. To date, Mum Says has been downloaded more than 8 million times.

Waterland created her next podcast in 2019, called Just The Gist. Distributed by LiSTNR, Just The Gist quickly rose to number one on the Apple Podcast chart, and has remained in the top ten since. Just The Gist won the 2020 Australian Podcast Award for Best Entertainment Podcast of the year, and in 2023 surpassed 10 million downloads. 

Along with her co-host Jacob Stanley, Waterland has also taken Just The Gist on two sold-out national live tours.

Personal life 
In December 2016, Waterland came out publicly as bisexual.

On 25 March 2019 she featured in ABC TV's Australian Story, along with her sisters and mother.

References

1986 births
Australian comedy writers
Living people
Bisexual actresses
Australian LGBT actors
Bisexual comedians
Australian LGBT screenwriters
21st-century Australian non-fiction writers
21st-century Australian women writers
Australian television writers
Australian women television writers
21st-century Australian screenwriters
Australian LGBT comedians